The 2021 Rhode Island Rams football team represented the University of Rhode Island as a member of the Colonial Athletic Association (CAA) in the 2021 NCAA Division I FCS football season. The Rams, led by eighth-year head coach Jim Fleming, played their home games at Meade Stadium.

On October 11, the Rams were named 12th in national FCS polls, the highest they have been ranked in 20 years. Andre Bibeault was named the Special Teams Player of the Week by the CAA.

Previous season

The Rams finished the 2020 season with a record of 2-1 (2-1 in the CAA). They finished in fourth place. Rhode Island started the season unranked, but climbed as high as No. 18 after a 2-0 start by week three. Rhode Island and the CAA would cancel the season after week three due to the COVID-19 pandemic.

The team finished the 2020 season unranked.

Schedule

Game summaries

Bryant

at Albany

at Brown

Stony Brook

No. 9 Delaware

at Towson

at No. 5 Villanova

Maine

at UMass

New Hampshire

at Elon

Ranking

Personnel

Coaching staff

Roster

References

Rhode Island
Rhode Island Rams football seasons
Rhode Island Rams football